In China, wet markets are traditional markets that sell fresh meat, produce, and other perishable goods. They are the most prevalent food outlet in urban regions of China but have faced increasing competition from supermarkets. Since the 1990s, wet markets in large cities have been predominantly moved into modern indoor facilities.

Wildlife is not commonly sold in wet markets in China, but poorly-regulated wet markets have been linked to the spread of zoonotic diseases, including the 2002–2004 SARS outbreak, 2013 avian influenza outbreak, and the COVID-19 pandemic. Small-scale wildlife farming emerged in China in the 1980s and expanded in the 1990s with government support. Wildlife was banned from Chinese wet markets in 2003, with further restrictions and enforcement in 2020 following the spread of COVID-19.

Modernization
Since the 1990s, large cities across China have moved traditional outdoor wet markets to modern indoor facilities. In 1999, all roadside markets in Hangzhou were banned and moved indoors. By 2014, all wet markets in Nanjing were moved indoors.

As of 2018, wet markets remain the most prevalent food outlet in urban regions of China despite the rise of supermarket chains since the 1990s. In 2016, a Meat & Livestock Australia study of imported meat consumers in 15 Chinese cities found that 39% of those consumers had purchased beef from a wet market in the preceding month, while the same proportion who had purchased beef from a supermarket in the preceding month. However, wet markets have been losing ground in popularity compared to supermarkets, despite the fact they may be seen as healthier and more sustainable. Reports suggest "although there are well-managed, hygienic wet markets in and near bigger cities [in China], hygiene can be spotty, especially in smaller communities." During the 2010s, "smart markets" equipped with e-payment terminals emerged as traditional wet markets faced increasing competition from discount stores. Wet markets also began facing competition from online grocery stores, such as Alibaba's Hema stores.

Wildlife markets

The trade of wildlife is not common in China, particularly in large cities, and most wet markets in China do not contain live or wild animals besides fish held in tanks. In the early 1980s, small-scale wildlife farming began under the Chinese economic reform. It began to expand nationwide with government support in the 1990s, but was largely concentrated in the southeastern provinces.

Some poorly-regulated Chinese wet markets provided outlets for the wildlife trade industry that was estimated by the Chinese Academy of Engineering to employ roughly 14 million people and to be worth more than $73 billion in 2016, of which $59 billion was for fur rather than for food or medicinal purposes.

Bans following SARS and avian influenza outbreaks

In 2003, wet markets across China were banned from holding wildlife after the 2002–2004 SARS outbreak, which was directly tied to such practices. In 2014, live poultry was banned from all markets in Hangzhou due to the H7N9 avian influenza outbreak. Several provinces in China also banned the sale of live poultry following the avian influenza outbreak.

Links to the origin of COVID-19

The exact origin of the COVID-19 pandemic is yet to be confirmed as of February 2021 and was originally linked to the Huanan Seafood Wholesale Market in Wuhan due to its early cluster of cases, although a 2021 WHO investigation concluded that the Huanan market was unlikely to be the origin due to the existence of earlier cases. Following the outbreak, epidemiology experts from China and a number of animal welfare organizations called to ban the operation of wet markets selling wild animals for human consumption.

The Huanan Seafood Wholesale Market was shut down on 1 January 2020. The Chinese government subsequently announced a temporary ban on the sale of wild animal products at wet markets on 26 January 2020, and then a permanent ban in February 2020 with an exception for Traditional Chinese Medicine ingredients, By 22 March 2020, at least 94% of the temporarily closed wet markets in China were reopened according to Chinese state-run media, without wild animals or wild meat. The reopening of wet markets led to public criticism of the Chinese government's handling of wet markets by Anthony Fauci and Lindsey Graham, although their criticisms have been attributed to semantic confusion between the terms "wet market" and "wildlife market". The World Health Organization responded with the recommendation that wet markets only be reopened "on the condition that they conform to stringent food safety and hygiene standards."

In April 2020, the Chinese government unveiled plans to further tighten restrictions on wildlife trade, with instructions and financial compensation for operations that were forcibly shut down. Deutsche Welle reported that by September 2020, the Chinese government had shut down almost all wildlife farms.

Hong Kong

Markets in Hong Kong are governed by the law of Hong Kong. Since 31 December 1999, Hong Kong wet markets have been regulated by the Food and Environmental Hygiene Department (FEHD).

See also
 Animal–industrial complex

References

Animal trade
Food markets in China
Retail markets in China
Wholesale markets in China